William H. Detrick (July 22, 1927 – September 19, 2014) was an American college basketball and golf coach.  He was most notable as head men's basketball coach at Central Connecticut State University (CCSU), where he served for 29 seasons and won a school-record 468 games.

Detrick was a three-sport athlete in baseball, football, and basketball at Central Connecticut, becoming the first student in school history to earn 12 varsity letters.  He returned to CCSU in 1959, as head coach where he remained until 1987.  After a short stint as head coach at the United States Coast Guard Academy, Detrick went on to become head golf coach at Trinity College in Connecticut, where he remained for 23 years and was a three-time conference coach of the year.

Detrick was an inaugural member of the Central Connecticut athletic Hall of Fame and was the namesake for the school's basketball arena, the William H. Detrick Gymnasium.  At Trinity, the school honored Detrick in 2013 be renaming its annual golf tournament the Bill Detrick Invitational.

Detrick died on September 19, 2014 at the age of 87.

References

1927 births
2014 deaths
American men's basketball coaches
American men's basketball players
United States Navy personnel of World War II
Basketball coaches from New Jersey
Basketball players from Newark, New Jersey
Central Connecticut Blue Devils baseball players
Central Connecticut Blue Devils football players
Central Connecticut Blue Devils men's basketball coaches
Central Connecticut Blue Devils men's basketball players
Coast Guard Bears men's basketball coaches
College golf coaches in the United States
College men's basketball head coaches in the United States
High school basketball coaches in the United States
Trinity College (Connecticut) faculty